Sigma Lambda Beta International Fraternity, Incorporated  (known as Betas, Lambda Betas or SLB) is a historically Latino based fraternity in the United States, now expanded to include a multicultural membership. Founded in 1986 at the University of Iowa, in Iowa City, Iowa the primary purpose of Sigma Lambda Beta is to promote Latino culture based upon the values of fairness, opportunity, and equality. The four principles are Brotherhood, Scholarship, Community Service, and Cultural Awareness.

After less than 30 years, Sigma Lambda Beta expanded to over 120 universities and across 30 states. Today, a collegiate entity can be found at some of the largest institutions. Membership into the organization is open to any person who meets intake requirements.

History
During the fall of 1985, a group of men alongside Baltazar Mendoza-Madrigal, a member of Phi Beta Sigma began to explore the idea of establishing a Latino-based fraternity at the University of Iowa, as they saw a need for a Latino fraternity at the predominantly non-Hispanic white university. Since its establishment, the organization tries to honor the principles of brotherhood, scholarship, community service, and cultural awareness.

The fraternity saw a rapid growth in its early years, according to Founding Father Ricardo Zamudio:

As the fraternity grew, Sigma Lambda Beta's membership grew and expanded beyond the Hispanic-Latino origins, making them one of the most diverse Greek lettered organizations in the United States. The organization left the National Association of Latino Fraternal Organizations (NALFO) due to their increasing multicultural membership and increasing regulatory nature (membership criteria).

Founding Fathers
Coming from all different backgrounds and walks of life the Eighteen Founding Fathers of Sigma Lambda Beta International Fraternity, Inc. are:

Philanthropy

National Philanthropy: Víctor Correa CPR Awareness Day
The Victor Correa CPR Awareness Day was created in honor of Sigma Lambda Beta brother Victor "Ziggy" Correa Ortiz who died during a drowning accident where none of the bystanders knew how to administer CPR. The fraternity encourages its members to host CPR training and awareness events.

National events

BetaCon 
Betacon is a biennial convention held by Sigma Lambda Beta. Past locations for the conference:

 1992 - Bloomington, IN
 1994 - Schaumburg, IL 
 1996 - Schaumburg, IL 
 1998 - Schaumburg, IL 
 2000 - Schaumburg, IL 
 2002 - Washington D.C.
 2004 - Orlando, FL
 2006 - Henderson, NV
 2008 - Dearborn, MI
 2010 - San Antonio, TX
 2012 - Tampa Bay, FL
 2014 - St. Louis, MO
 2016 - Dallas, TX
 2018 - Denver, CO
 2020 - Virtual
 2022 - Reno, NV

Leadership Institute 
Held every other year (alternating with BetaCon), Leadership Institute is a 3-day leadership conference where collegiate brothers are guided through a tailored curriculum with the objective to enhance their leadership and organizational skills to better meet the mission of the fraternity.

Education Foundation 
In 2001, brothers of the fraternity formed the Sigma Lambda Beta International Fraternity, Inc.’s Educational Foundation as a 501(c)3 tax-exempt organization. The money raised by the Sigma Lambda Beta Education Foundation is used mainly for the purpose of funding educational and leadership development programs for Sigma Lambda Beta International Fraternity, Inc., as well as for scholarships that are made available to undergraduate and graduate student members.

See also
List of social fraternities and sororities

References

External links
 Sigma Lambda Beta National Website
 Sigma Lambda Beta Educational Foundation

 
1986 establishments in Iowa
Fraternities and sororities in Puerto Rico
Fraternity Leadership Association
Hispanic and Latino American organizations
International student societies
Latino fraternities and sororities
North American Interfraternity Conference
Student organizations established in 1986
Student societies in the United States
University of Iowa